Microdes epicryptis is a moth in the family Geometridae. It is found in New Zealand.

References

Moths described in 1897
Eupitheciini
Moths of New Zealand
Endemic fauna of New Zealand
Taxa named by Edward Meyrick
Endemic moths of New Zealand